Wayne Lawrence (born 1974 in  Saint Kitts) is a documentary photographer. He is based in Brooklyn, New York.

Early life and education
He was born in St. Kitts. His first visit to New York was when he was 16 years old. He then moved west and worked as a commercial carpenter. He attended Brooks Institute, Santa Barbara.

Work
Lawrence is known for his photographic series called Orchard Beach: The Bronx Riviera and Black Orthodox.

Awards
He was selected by Photo District News as one of their 30 photographers to watch in 2010. He was awarded the American Photography Annual (2012, 2013), Arnold Newman Prize for New Directions in Portraiture (2013), The Aaron Siskind Foundation Individual Photographer's Fellowship (2013) and International Photography Awards (2012).

Exhibitions
He has exhibited at the FLAG Art Foundation, The Bronx Museum of Art, Amerika Haus(Munich), Open Society Institute, The African American Museum in Philadelphia, The Nathan Cummings Foundation, The George and Leah McKenna Museum of African American Art, The Corridor Gallery and The Calumet Gallery.

Publications
Lawrence was published in The New York Times Magazine,  The New Yorker, Time, The Sunday Times, Mother Jones, Esquire, Essence, Newsweek, Photo District News, Trace, Vibe, XXL, Afisha Mir, British Journal of Photography, Colors, Mare, Communication Arts, Le Monde, Gioia, GUP, Marie Claire and Repubblica xL.

His first monograph, Orchard Beach: The Bronx Riviera, was published by Prestel Publishing in October 2013.

Notes

External links
 http://waynelawrenceonline.com/

American photographers
1974 births
Social documentary photographers
African-American photographers
Living people
People from Saint Kitts
21st-century African-American people
20th-century African-American people